Jelena, also written Yelena and Elena, is a Slavic given name. It is a Slavicized form of the Greek name Helen, which is of uncertain origin. Diminutives of the name include Jelica, Jelka, Jele, Jela, Lena, Lenotschka, Jeca, Lenka, and Alena.

Notable people

Nobility
Jelena Anžujska, Serbian Queen (d. 1314)
Jelena of Bulgaria, Empress consort of Serbia (d. 1374)
Jelena Petrović Njegoš, Montenegrin princess and Queen of Italy
Jelena of Serbia, many Serbian consorts
Jelena Urošević Vukanović, Queen consort of Hungary 
Jelena Zrinski, Princess Consort of Transylvania and Croatian noblewoman

Other people
Jelena Agbaba, Serbian handball player
Elena Berezhnaya, Russian figure skater
Jelena Blagojević, Serbian volleyball player
Yelena Bonner, Russian writer
Jelena Brooks (Milovanović), Serbian basketball player
Jelena Dokić, Australian tennis player of Croatian and Serbian origin
Jelena Glebova, Estonian figure skater
Jelena 'Gigi' Hadid, American model
Jelena Grubišić, Croatian handball player
Jelena Janković, Serbian tennis player
Jelena Jensen, American glamour model and pornstar
Jelena Jovanova, Macedonian actress
Jelena Karleuša, Serbian singer
Jelena Kovacevic, Serbian-American engineering professor and dean
Jelena Lavko, Serbian handball player
Jelena Likhovtseva, Russian tennis player
Jelena McWilliams (Obrenic), Chairman of the Federal Deposit Insurance Corporation (June 5, 2018)
Jelena Milesic, Artist 
Jelena Mrdjenovich, Serbian-Canadian boxer
Jelena Nikolić, Serbian volleyball player
Jelena Nurgalieva, Russian marathon runner
Jeļena Ostapenko, Latvian tennis player
Jelena Perepelkina, Russian wrestler
Jelena Porsanger (born 1967), Russian Sami ethnographer and university rector
Jeļena Prokopčuka, Latvian long-distance runner
Yelena Romanova, Russian long-distance runner
Jelena Rozga, Croatian singer
Jelena Tripolski (born 1967), Israeli Olympic sport shooter
Elena Valova, Russian figure skater
Elena Vesnina, Russian tennis player

Related names
Helen, Helena, Yelena, Elena, Elaine, Ellen, Eleanor, Alyona, Alyena, Aliena, Olyena, Alena

See also
Jelena (TV series)

Croatian feminine given names
Serbian feminine given names
Slovene feminine given names